The 50th Infantry Division (50-ya Pekhotnaya Diviziya) was an infantry formation of the Russian Imperial Army. Its headquarters was located at Saint Petersburg.

Organization
It was part of the 18th Army Corps.
1st Brigade
 197th Lesnoi Infantry Regiment
 198th Alexander Nevsky Infantry Regiment
2nd Brigade
 199th Kronstadt Infantry Regiment
 200th Kronshlotsky Infantry Regiment
50th Artillery Brigade

References

Infantry divisions of the Russian Empire
Military units and formations disestablished in 1918
Saint Petersburg Governorate